The Veligonda Project is an irrigation project located in Markapur, Prakasam district in Andhra Pradesh, India. When completed, the project will provide irrigational facilities to 459,000 acres and drinking water to 1.5 million people in 29 Mandals of fluoride and drought affected areas in Prakasam district, Nellore district and Kadapa district by diverting 43.5 TMC of floodwater from the Krishna River from foreshore of Srisailam Reservoir near Kollamvagu and proposed to store in Nallamalasagar Reservoir. The water for the project is drawn through two 18.8 km long tunnels across Nallamala hills. The project has been renamed to the "Poola Subbaiah Irrigation Project". It displaces around 20,946 families. The oustees have protested for enhanced compensation over the years and many have not received the compensation promised to them.

Construction

In 2004 Dr YS Rajasekhar Reddy then Chief Minister,made this project with allocation of funds and doing work in 3 phases.

The construction includes two parallel tunnels of 18.8 km with 9.2 m and 7 m internal diameter and 21.6 km Flood flow canal for the water transmission system linking with Srisailam Reservoir up to Guntur-Kurnool road. The project is being implemented by a double shielded tunnel boring machine to make the tunnel without disturbing wildlife in the Nagarjunsagar-Srisailam Tiger Reserve.

Krishna river water is stored in a reservoir called 'Nallamala Sagar' with 43.5 Tmcft live storage at 244 m msl full reservoir level and 214.3 m msl minimum draw down level. Full supply level to the tunnels from the Srisailam reservoir is 857 ft msl (261.2 m msl) and the sill level at tunnels water inlet is 840 ft msl (256.03 m msl).

The first tunnel completed as of 14 January 2021.

Project Timeline

References

Irrigation in Andhra Pradesh
Buildings and structures in Prakasam district